Rémi Royer (born February 12, 1978) is a Canadian former professional ice hockey defenceman.

Biography
Royer was born in Donnacona, Quebec. As a youth, he played in the 1992 Quebec International Pee-Wee Hockey Tournament with a minor ice hockey team from Sainte-Foy, Quebec City.

Royer was drafted 31st overall by the Blackhawks in the 1996 NHL Entry Draft. He played 18 games in the National Hockey League for the Chicago Blackhawks. He scored no points, but collected 67 penalty minutes. He later played for EC Red Bull Salzburg, HDD Olimpija Ljubljana, and Rivière-du-Loup CIMT in the Ligue Nord-Américaine de Hockey.

References

External links

1978 births
Canadian ice hockey defencemen
Canadian expatriate ice hockey players in Austria
Canadian expatriate ice hockey players in France
Chicago Blackhawks draft picks
Chicago Blackhawks players
Cleveland Lumberjacks players
Diables Rouges de Briançon players
EC Red Bull Salzburg players
Florida Everblades players
Houston Aeros (1994–2013) players
Ice hockey people from Quebec
Indianapolis Ice players
Living people
Louisville Panthers players
Pensacola Ice Pilots players
People from Capitale-Nationale
Portland Pirates players
Providence Bruins players
Quebec Citadelles players
Quebec RadioX players
Reading Royals players
Rouyn-Noranda Huskies players
Victoriaville Tigres players